The 2014–15 AS Saint-Étienne season was the 82nd professional season of the club since its creation in 1933.

Players

First team squad

French teams are limited to four players without EU citizenship. Hence, the squad list includes only the principal nationality of each player; several non-European players on the squad have dual citizenship with an EU country. Also, players from the ACP countries—countries in Africa, the Caribbean, and the Pacific that are signatories to the Cotonou Agreement—are not counted against non-EU quotas due to the Kolpak ruling.

Competitions

Ligue 1

League table

Results summary

Results by round

Matches

Coupe de la Ligue

Coupe de France

UEFA Europa League

Play-off Round

Group stage

Statistics

Appearances and goals

|-
! colspan=14 style=background:#dcdcdc; text-align:center| Goalkeepers

|-
! colspan=14 style=background:#dcdcdc; text-align:center| Defenders

|-
! colspan=14 style=background:#dcdcdc; text-align:center| Midfielders

|-
! colspan=14 style=background:#dcdcdc; text-align:center| Forwards

References

AS Saint-Étienne seasons
Saint-Etienne